Pseudotelphusa quercinigracella is a moth of the family Gelechiidae. It is found in the United States, including Kentucky, Maryland and Oklahoma.

References

Moths described in 1872
Parastenolechia